"Sublime" is the second song released by Australian musical duo Shakaya from their self-titled debut album (2002). It reached number 19 on the Australian Singles Chart.

Track listings
 Original single
 "Sublime"
 "Sublime" (House mix)
 "Sublime" (Sam Gee Clubb mix)
 "Sublime" (Smoooth mix)
 "Stop Calling Me" (Grooove mix)

 "Sublime" / "Stop Calling Me"
 "Sublime"
 "Stop Calling Me"
 "Stop Calling Me" (House mix, Mobin Master & Dj Hess)
 "Stop Calling Me" (Nurban mix, New Breed)
 "Stop Calling Me" (Gomez mix)

Charts

References

2002 singles
Columbia Records singles
Shakaya songs